Gary Gussman (born September 24, 1965) is a former American football placekicker and coach. He was the special teams coach for the Tampa Bay Storm of the Arena Football League (AFL) in 2017. He previously played four seasons in the AFL with the Denver Dynamite and Albany Firebirds. He played college football at Miami University.

College career
Gussman played for the Miami RedHawks from 1984 to 1987. He was named All-MAC three consecutive seasons, including First Team and All-American honors as a senior in 1987.

Professional career
Gussman played for the AFL's Denver Dynamite in 1989, earning First Team All-Arena honors. He played for the Albany Firebirds of the AFL from 1990 to 1992, earning Second Team All-Arena honors in 1990.

Coaching career
Gussman was the special teams coordinator of the AFL's Connecticut Coyotes in 1995. He was special teams coordinator of the Houston Thunderbears of the AFL from 1998 to 2001. He was special teams coordinator of the Orlando Predators of the AFL in 2002. Gussman was head coach of the Rio Grande Valley Dorados of the af2 in 2004. He was special teams coordinator and Director of Football Operations for the AFL's Las Vegas Gladiators from 2005 to 2006. He was special teams coordinator of the New Orleans VooDoo of the AFL from 2007 to 2008. Gussman was assistant head coach/special teams coordinator of the Orlando Predators of the AFL from 2010 to 2011. In March 2017, Gussman was named the special teams coach for the Tampa Bay Storm of the AFL.

Administrative career
Gussman was named Director of Football Operations for the New Orleans VooDoo in September 2011. He was also named interim general manager of the VooDoo in August 2012. He resigned in March 2013.

References

External links
Just Sports Stats
College Stats

Living people
1965 births
Players of American football from Miami
American football placekickers
Miami RedHawks football players
Denver Dynamite (arena football) players
Albany Firebirds players
Connecticut Coyotes coaches
Orlando Predators coaches
Houston Thunderbears coaches
Rio Grande Valley Dorados coaches
Las Vegas Gladiators coaches
New Orleans VooDoo coaches
Tampa Bay Storm coaches
Arena Football League executives
Sports coaches from Miami